Frank Dumont (January 25, 1848 – March 17, 1919) was an American minstrel show performer and manager.<ref name="obit1">(17 March 1919). Frank Dumont, Noted Minstrel, Dies At Theatre, Evening Public Ledger</ref>

Life
Dumont was born in Utica, New York, on January 25, 1848.  He started performing in minstrel shows as early as 1862, and worked with a number of groups, including Duprez & Benedict's Minstrels from about 1869 to 1881.  He eventually founded "Dumont's Minstrels", around 1895/96, after purchasing the Eleventh Street Opera House in Philadelphia.  He authored many sketches and songs for the genre.  One afterpiece he wrote was later expanded into a successful 1884 play, A Parlor Match.

After the Opera House closed circa 1909, Dumont acquired Dime Museum at Ninth and Arch Streets and renamed it "Dumont's Theatre".  He died in the box office of the theatre on March 17, 1919, during the opening number of that afternoon's matinee show.(26 May 1939) Mrs. Frank Dumont (obituary), The New York Times  He is interred at Laurel Hill Cemetery in Philadelphia.  

Dumont's 1899 work "The Witmark amateur minstrel guide and burnt cork encyclopedia" is a valuable resource on the history of American minstrelsy. 

Dumont wrote in 1915 that he had been the first to perform two classic 19th century standards, "Silver Threads Among the Gold", and "When You and I Were Young, Maggie".

Pat Chappelle commissioned Dumont in 1900 to write A Rabbit's Foot, a comedy-based show that became a hit and led to the creation of Chappelle's "Rabbit's Foot (Comedy) Company." Chappelle was the first black owner of a vaudeville company with an all-black cast, and utilized upscale performers that helped him dominate the southwest and southeastern areas of the U.S. and also traveled to New Jersey, New York, Washington, D.C., and Baltimore. Lynn Abbott, Doug Seroff, Ragged But Right: Black Traveling Shows, Coon Songs, and the Dark Pathway to Blues and Jazz, Univ. Press of Mississippi, 2009, pp.248-289

References

External links
 Dumont, Frank. The Witmark Amateur Minstrel Guide and Burnt Cork Encyclopedia (1899) (full copy online)
 The Frank Dumont Minstrelsy Scrapbook 1850-1902, containing more than 50 years of documentation about minstrelsy and its origins, is available for research use at the Historical Society of Pennsylvania.
 The Younger Generation in Minstrelsy and Reminiscences of the Past, by Frank Dumont, New York Clipper'', March 27, 1915

Blackface minstrel performers
1848 births
1919 deaths
19th-century American singers